The 1944 Miami Redskins football team was an American football team that represented Miami University as an independent during the 1944 college football season. In its first season under head coach Sid Gillman, Miami compiled an 8–1 record and outscored all opponents by a combined total of 185 to 74. The team won its first eight games before losing to DePauw (7–13). Ned Shiflett was the team captain.

Schedule

References

Miami
Miami RedHawks football seasons
Miami Redskins football